Jim Franklin is a British television director and producer.

He has directed many British television comedy programmes, including The Goodies, Broaden Your Mind and Ripping Yarns.

External links

British television directors
British television producers
Year of birth missing
Possibly living people